The men's marathon at the 2015 World Championships in Athletics was held at the Beijing National Stadium on 22 August.

The name Gebrselassie is familiar in running circles, but this race was won by Haile's sound alike Ghirmay Ghebreslassie from a different country, neighboring Eritrea.  Not only was he the youngest winner of a World Championship marathon, he was the first gold medalist for his country ever.

The early leader was Ser-Od Bat-Ochir, then Daniele Meucci and Ruggero Pertile getting camera time to the half way mark while the favorites including defending champion Stephen Kiprotich stayed slightly off the pace.  Ghebreslassie marked the more experienced runners.  Tsepo Ramonene made a breakaway at 25 km opening up a 30-second lead.  As he watched two Kenyans drop out and other favorites struggle, Ghebreslassie decided to set loose at 34 km.  Over the next couple of kilometers, he made up the gap and passed Ramonene with authority.  But a couple of kilometers later Yemane Tsegay passed Ghebreslassie.  Tsegay's lead only lasted two minutes until Ghebreslassie took the lead for good.  Over the final kilometers, he extended his lead to 40 seconds.  Running relaxed and fast like an exuberant teenager, he was handed an Eritrean flag as he entered the stadium.	
He held his flag but kept on running past the finish line until officials were able to tell him he was done.  “I’ve never finished in a stadium before.”  Behind him, in comparison, Tsegay, Solomon Mutai and the other runners finished looking as if they had just finished a marathon.

Records
Prior to the competition, the records were as follows:

Qualification standards

Schedule

Results
The race was started at 07:35.

References

Marathon
Marathons at the World Athletics Championships
Marathons in China
Men's marathons